Bolshaya Kyrkyla is a rural locality (a settlement) in Proletarsky Selsoviet, Altaysky District, Altai Krai, Russia. The population was 13 as of 2013. There is 1 street.

Geography 
Bolshaya Kyrkyla is located 25 km south of Altayskoye (the district's administrative centre) by road. Proletarka is the nearest rural locality.

References 

Rural localities in Altaysky District, Altai Krai